Chronicles of Gnarnia is a compilation album by the British punk rock band Gnarwolves, released 24 February 2014. The album compiles songs from Gnarwolves first three EPs, Fun Club, CRU and Funemployed.

Track listing

Personnel
Gnarwolves
Thom Weeks - Vocals/Guitar
Charlie Piper - Vocals/Bass
Max Weeks - Drums

References

2013 compilation albums
Gnarwolves albums